Asha is a town and the administrative center of Ashinsky District in Chelyabinsk Oblast, Russia, located on the Sim River (a tributary of the Belaya),  west of Chelyabinsk, the administrative center of the oblast. Population:

History
It was founded in 1898 and was granted town status on June 20, 1933.

On June 4, 1989, the Ufa train disaster—a huge liquefied petroleum gas explosion that killed or injured 1,200 people—occurred near Asha.

Administrative and municipal status
Within the framework of administrative divisions, Asha serves as the administrative center of Ashinsky District. As an administrative division, it is incorporated within Ashinsky District as the Town of Asha. As a municipal division, the Town of Asha is incorporated within Ashinsky Municipal District as Ashinskoye Urban Settlement.

Sports
Asha is known for Adzhigardak, its ski resort.

References

Notes

Sources

External links
Official website of Asha 
Directory of organizations in Asha 

Cities and towns in Chelyabinsk Oblast
Monotowns in Russia